The Biggest Loser UK Series 2 was the second UK series of the reality TV weight loss show The Biggest Loser. The 12 contestants on the show were split into two teams who were trained by fitness trainers Mark Bailey and Angie Dowds. The series had 12 episodes that aired weekly on LIVINGtv from 11 October to 27 December 2006. The episode with the highest viewership numbers was episode 11, which aired on 20 December and was seen by 200,000 viewers. The winner of the series was Jodie who lost 46.85% of her starting body weight and won £25,000.

Weigh Ins
Teams
 Member of Angie's team.
 Member of Mark's team.
 Ben went from the Red Team to the Blue Team in Wk 3.
 Rachel was not present at the finale.
Game
 Last person eliminated before the finale.
Winners
 £25,000 Winner (among the finalists).
 Caribbean Trip Winner (among the eliminated players).

Ratings
Episode Viewing figures from BARB

References

External links

2006 British television seasons
UK